Habrocestum personatum is a jumping spider species that lives in Nigeria. It was first described in 2011.

References

Endemic fauna of Nigeria
Salticidae
Fauna of Nigeria
Spiders of Africa
Spiders described in 2011
Taxa named by Wanda Wesołowska